The Christian People's Party, Faroese Progress and Fisheries Party (KFFFF), generally known as the Christian People's Party (KF), was a political party in the Faroe Islands.

History
The party was established in the mid-1950s by dissidents from the People's Party, and was originally known as the Progress Party (Framburðsflokkurin). In the 1958 elections it won a single seat in the Løgting, taken by Kjartan Mohr. The party retained its single seat in elections in 1962, 1966, 1970 and 1974, with Mohr remaining its sole MP.

Prior to the 1978 elections it merged with the Fisheries Party to become the Progress and Fisheries Party (Framburðs- og Fiskivinnuflokkurin). The new party won two seats, retaining both in the 1980 elections. In 1984 it adopted its final name, again retaining its two seats in the Løgting in the 1984 elections.

The party won two seats in elections in 1988, 1990 and 1994. However, it lost both seats in the 1998 elections and subsequently folded.

Election results

Faroese general elections

Danish general elections

References

Defunct political parties in the Faroe Islands
Defunct Christian political parties
Protestant political parties
Political parties established in 1954
Political parties disestablished in 2000